Eugenia mabaeoides is a species of plant in the Myrtaceae. It is found only in Sri Lanka.

References

 
 http://www.theplantlist.org/tpl1.1/record/kew-75804
 https://www.gbif.org/species/108930784

Endemic flora of Sri Lanka
mabaeoides
Taxobox binomials not recognized by IUCN